In mathematics, a translation plane is a projective plane which admits a certain group of symmetries (described below). Along with the Hughes planes and the Figueroa planes, translation planes are among the most well-studied of the known non-Desarguesian planes, and the vast majority of known non-Desarguesian planes are either translation planes, or can be obtained from a translation plane via successive iterations of dualization and/or derivation.

In a projective plane, let  represent a point, and  represent a line. The central collineations with center  and axis  form a group. A line  in a projective plane  is a translation line if the group of all elations with axis  acts transitively on the points of the affine plane obtained by removing  from the plane ,  (the affine derivative of ). A projective plane with a translation line is called a translation plane.

The affine plane obtained by removing the translation line is called an affine translation plane. While it is often easier to work with projective planes, in this context several authors use the term translation plane to mean affine translation plane.

Algebraic construction with coordinates 
Every projective plane can be coordinatized by at least one planar ternary ring. For translation planes, it is always possible to coordinatize with a quasifield. However, some quasifields satisfy additional algebraic properties, and the corresponding planar ternary rings coordinatize translation planes which admit additional symmetries. Some of these special classes are:

 Nearfield planes - coordinatized by nearfields.
 Semifield planes - coordinatized by semifields, semifield planes have the property that their dual is also a translation plane.
 Moufang planes - coordinatized by alternative division rings, Moufang planes are exactly those translation planes that have at least two translation lines. Every finite Moufang plane is Desarguesian and every Desarguesian plane is a Moufang plane, but there are infinite Moufang planes that are not Desarguesian (such as the Cayley plane).

Geometric construction with spreads (Bruck/Bose)

Translation planes are related to spreads of odd-dimensional projective spaces by the Bruck-Bose construction.

Then  is an affine translation plane. In the finite case, this procedure produces a translation plane of order .

The converse of this statement is almost always true. Any translation plane which is coordinatized by a quasifield that is finite-dimensional over its kernel  ( is necessarily a division ring) can be generated from a spread of  using the Bruck-Bose construction, where 
 is the dimension of the quasifield, considered as a module over its kernel. An instant corollary of this result is that every finite translation plane can be obtained from this construction.

Algebraic construction with spreads (André)
André gave an earlier algebraic representation of (affine) translation planes that is fundamentally the same as Bruck/Bose. Let  be a -dimensional vector space over a field . Then:

The finite case
Let , the finite field of order  and  the -dimensional vector space over  represented as:

For  define,

usually referred to as the subspaces "". Also define:

the subspace "".
The set of matrices  used in this construction is called a spread set, and this set of matrices can be used directly in the projective space  to create a spread in the geometric sense.

Reguli and regular spreads

Let  be the projective space  for  an integer, and  a division ring.
  contains at least 3 elements
 Every point of a transversal to  lies on some element of 

Any three pairwise disjoint -dimensional subspaces in  lie in a unique regulus. A slightly weaker converse holds: if a translation plane is Pappian, then it can be generated via the André/Bruck-Bose construction from a regular spread.

While the only translation plane of order 8 is Desarguesian, there are known to be non-Desarguesian translation planes of order  for every integer .

Families of non-Desarguesian translation planes
 Hall planes - constructed via Bruck/Bose from a regular spread of  where one regulus has been replaced by the set of transversal lines to that regulus (called the opposite regulus).
 Subregular planes - constructed via Bruck/Bose from a regular spread of  where a set of pairwise disjoint reguli have been replaced by their opposite reguli.
 André planes
 Nearfield planes
 Semifield planes

Finite translation planes of small order
It is well known that the only projective planes of order 8 or less are Desarguesian, and there are no known non-Desarguesian planes of prime order. Finite translation planes must have prime power order. There are four projective planes of order 9, of which two are translation planes: the Desarguesian plane, and the Hall plane. The following table details the current state of knowledge:

Notes

References

Further reading
 Mauro Biliotti, Vikram Jha, Norman L. Johnson (2001) Foundations of Translation Planes, Marcel Dekker  .

External links
 Lecture Notes on Projective Geometry
 Publications of Keith Mellinger

Projective geometry